Cerro Ciento, at  above sea level is the tenth highest peak in the Boulder Mountains of Idaho. Cerro Ciento is the 80th highest peak in Idaho.

The easiest route is an off-trail class 2 scramble from the end of the Spring Creek Road, which can be accessed from Idaho State Highway 75. The peak is easily visible from the highway and Galena Summit.

References 

Mountains of Idaho
Mountains of Custer County, Idaho
Sawtooth National Forest